Sweetie is a 1929 American pre-Code musical film directed by Frank Tuttle, written by George Marion Jr. and Lloyd Corrigan, and starring Nancy Carroll, Helen Kane, Jack Oakie, William Austin, Stuart Erwin, and Wallace MacDonald. It was released on November 2, 1929, by Paramount Pictures.

Plot
School spirit is high at Pelham University, which finally has a football team that can beat the rival school, Oglethorpe. What almost nobody knows is that Biff Bentley, the team captain, is planning to quit school to marry his chorus-girl fiancee, Barbara Pell. When, at the last minute, he's talked into staying for the good of the team, Barbara is furious that he's putting football ahead of his love for her.

It has left her in an uncomfortable position as well: She had quit a good job in order to marry him and will not be able to get that job back. Tap-Tap Thompson, her fellow Broadway performer, manages to find her a new job in a chorus, but she is so upset over her relationship with Biff that she can’t learn the footwork, putting her job in jeopardy.

It is at this moment that Prof. Willow enters her life, revealing that Barbara Pell is only her stage name. Her real name is Barbara Pelham, and she has just inherited Pelham University. She immediately moves on campus to take command—and take revenge on the football team.

Cast 
Nancy Carroll as Barbara Pell
Helen Kane as Helen Fry
Stanley Smith as Biff Bentley
Jack Oakie as Tap-Tap Thoompson
William Austin as Prof. Willow
Stuart Erwin as Axel Bronstrup
Wallace MacDonald as Bill Barington
Charles Sellon as Dr. Oglethorpe
Aileen Manning as Miss Twill
Joseph Depew as Freddie Fry

References

External links 
 

1929 films
1920s English-language films
American musical films
1929 musical films
Paramount Pictures films
Films directed by Frank Tuttle
American black-and-white films
1920s American films